Ramsdell is a small village in the English county of Hampshire. 

Ramsdell can also refer to:

People 
 Charles Ramsdell (basketball) (born 1985), Malagasy athlete
 Charles W. Ramsdell (1877–1942), American historian
 Fred Ramsdell (born 1961), American immunologist
 Frederick Winthrop Ramsdell (1865–1915), American artist
 George A. Ramsdell (1834–1900), American lawyer, businessman, and Republican politician
 Heather Ramsdell, American poet and playwright.
 Homer Ramsdell (1810–1894), American business man
 Jeffrey M. Ramsdell, judge of the Superior Court of Washington for King County (Seattle).
 Jay Ramsdell (1964/1965–1989), Commissioner of the Continental Basketball Association (CBA)
Lewis S. Ramsdell  (1895–1975), American mineralogist after whom Ramsdellite was named
 Thomas J. Ramsdell (1833-1917), entrepreneur and Michigan State Representative
 Walter L. Ramsdell, Massachusetts politician
 Willie Ramsdell (1916–1969), pitcher in Major League Baseball

And:
 Erwin Ramsdell Goodenough (1893–1965)

Other 
 Hiram Ramsdell House
 Ramsdell Hall

 Ramsdell Public Library
 Ramsdell Theatre
 Z. D. Ramsdell House
 Hezekiah S. Ramsdell Farm

See also 
 Ramsdale (disambiguation)